James Blackburn,  (8 March 1916 – 1993) was a Royal Air Force officer who completed a record five tours of operations during the Second World War.

Early life
Blackburn was born on 8 March 1916, in Acton, London, the son of Sir Arthur Dickinson Blackburn, and was educated at Wellington College, Berkshire, and The Queen's College, Oxford. While at Oxford he joined the Oxford University Air Squadron, and was commissioned in to the Royal Air Force Reserve of Officers in 1936.

Second World War
During the Second World War, Blackburn served first as a Blenheim pilot with No. 57 Squadron and then with No. 70 Squadron as a flight lieutenant, later to be promoted to squadron leader and then wing commander. Blackburn was awarded the Distinguished Flying Cross in November 1941, followed by a Bar to the award in September 1942.

Blackburn was posted to North Africa in May 1942 to take command of No. 104 Squadron and remained in command of the squadron until August 1942.

On 12 September 1942, Blackburn was travelling aboard the  when it was torpedoed 130 miles north-northeast of Ascension Island, by the German submarine U-156. The events that followed became known as the Laconia incident. Blackburn survived the sinking of the Laconia and was taken prisoner of war, later to be imprisoned in Vichy controlled Morocco. In November 1942, Blackburn along with three other officers escaped and made their way to the American held lines in Morocco.

In October 1943, Blackburn was awarded the Distinguished Service Order (DSO) while in command of No. 148 Squadron.

From July 1944 to January 1945, Blackburn commanded No. 159 Squadron.

In December 1944, Blackburn was awarded a Bar to his DSO, working for Force 136, in recognition of his exemplary leadership during bombing and mine-laying missions. Blackburn was also awarded the American Distinguished Flying Cross by the United States Air Force, in recognition of the pioneering work that No. 159 Squadron carried out, extending the operational range of the Consolidated Liberator aircraft. Following his presentation with the medal, Blackburn held a party to celebrate at Firpos restaurant in Calcutta.

Blackburn commanded No. 570 Squadron from 15 December 1945 until 8 January 1946, and then No. 196 Squadron until 16 March 1946.

Awards and honours
 4 November 1941, Flight Lieutenant James Blackburn (70067), Reserve of Air Force Officers, No.70 Squadron, awarded the Distinguished Flying Cross:

 18 September 1942, Acting Wing Commander James Blackburn DFC (70067), Reserve of Air Force Officers, No.70 Squadron, awarded Bar to Distinguished Flying Cross:

 1 October 1943, Wing Commander James Blackburn DFC (70067), Reserve of Air Force Officers, No.148 Squadron, awarded the Distinguished Service Order:

 8 December 1944, Wing Commander James Blackburn DSO, DFC (70067), R.A.F.O., No.159 Squadron, awarded Bar to Distinguished Service Order:

Notes

References

 
 
 
 Smiley, David. Irregular Regular. Norwich, UK: Michael Russell, 1994. . Translated in French by Thierry Le Breton, Au coeur de l'action clandestine des commandos au MI6. Sceaux, France: L’Esprit du Livre Editions, 2008. . With numerous photographs.

External links
 http://www.unithistories.com/officers/RAF_officers_B01.html
 http://www.acseac.co.uk/forum/index.php?a=topic&t=70
 http://www.iwm.org.uk/collections/item/object/1030023610

1916 births
1993 deaths
Royal Air Force wing commanders
Royal Air Force pilots of World War II
British World War II bomber pilots
Recipients of the Distinguished Flying Cross (United States)
Alumni of The Queen's College, Oxford
People educated at Wellington College, Berkshire
People from Acton, London
Companions of the Distinguished Service Order
Recipients of the Distinguished Flying Cross (United Kingdom)